Ofelia Cano is a Mexican actress. She appeared in many telenovelas. Some of her better known roles are the one of Rebeca in Entre el amor y el odio and Yolanda in Acorralada.

Filmography

Sources

Mexican telenovela actresses
1959 births
Living people